Northover may refer to:

Places

Canada
Mount Northover, on the border of Alberta and British Columbia, named after A. W. Northover

England
Northover, Ilchester, Somerset 
Northover, Somerset, on the outskirts of Glastonbury

United States
Northover Camp, NJ, in Somerset County, New Jersey

People
Benn Northover (born 1981), British actor, filmmaker and artist
Bob Northover, British sport shooter
Dean Northover (born 1991), Canadian soccer player
John Northover (fl. 1646), English landowner and participant in the English Civil War
Lindsay Northover, Baroness Northover (born 1954), British politician
Mark Northover (1950–2004), British actor
Zara Northover (born 1984), Jamaican shot-putter

Other
Northover Projector, a British anti-tank weapon of the Second World War